The 2013 Bloomington Edge season was the team's seventh overall, second as the Bloomington Edge and first as a member of the Champions Professional Indoor Football League (CPIFL). One of ten teams in the CPIFL for the inaugural 2013 season, the Edge finished the regular season with a 5-7 record, failing to qualify for the postseason.

Schedule
Key:

Regular season

Roster

References

Bloomington Edge
Bloomington Edge
Bloomington Edge seasons